Fiji was a British Crown colony from 1874 to 1970, and an independent dominion in the Commonwealth from 1970 to 1987. During this period, the head of state was the British monarch, but in practice his or her functions were normally exercised locally by the governor prior to independence (on 10 October 1970), and by the governor-general prior to the proclamation of a republic on 7 October 1987.

Note that from 1877 to 3 July 1952, governors of Fiji were also high commissioners for the Western Pacific.

List of governors of Fiji (1874–1970)
Following is a list of people who have served as governor of Fiji.

In 1970, Fiji gained independence from the United Kingdom. After independence, the viceroy in Fiji was the governor-general of Fiji.

Governor's flag

Further reading
 Paul Knaplund, "Sir Arthur Gordon and Fiji: Some Gordon-Gladstone Letters." Historical Studies: Australia and New Zealand 8#31 (1958) pp 281–296.

See also
Governor-General of Fiji
List of heads of state of Fiji

Fiji, Governors
History of Fiji
Politics of Fiji
Government of Fiji
 
High Commissioners for the Western Pacific
Fiji